Greg Stevens was an Australian writer and script editor.

He was a writer and script editor on Sons and Daughters and was a story editor and script editor on Home and Away for eight years during its formative years.

In 1996 he went to work on Neighbours as a script producer. In December 1996 he was arrested on charges of having sex with a 14-year-old boy and resigned from his position. He was given a 12-month gaol sentence suspended for two years.

Stevens then moved to Europe and worked on shows there.

Select Credits
Waterloo Station
Sons and Daughters - script editor, writer
Home and Away - story editor, script editor, writer, script producer (1993)
Neighbours - script producer (1996)
Barátok közt (1998) - head writer
Verbotene Liebe (1998) - story editor
Skilda världar  (1998-2002) - story consultant
Secret Lives (1999 TV series) (1999) - original idea
Szeress most! (2003) - head writer

References

External links
Greg Stevens at AustLit

Australian television writers
Living people
Year of birth missing (living people)
Australian male television writers